Louisiana Highway 8 (LA 8) is a state highway in Louisiana. It spans  beginning at the Louisiana/Texas state line west of Leesville and ending at an intersection with U.S. Route 425 and LA 15 in Sicily Island.

Route description
From the west State Highway 63 becomes LA 8 after crossing the Sabine River near Burr Ferry.  At the Burr's Ferry Bridge in Vernon Parish, LA 8 heads east, and merges with U.S. Highway 171 north in Leesville. In Leesville, U.S. 171/LA 8 continues north as a four lane, divided road through town. LA 8 breaks off from U.S. 171 at the northern city limits and joins and runs concurrent with LA 28 east, and continues northeastward as a four lane divided Highway. LA 28/LA 8 intersects with LA 468 (The old Slagle road) south just before LA 8 splits and heads northeast as a two lane road, Intersecting with LA 469, passing through Slagle, intersecting LA 121, the LA 465, and passing north of Simpson, before exiting Vernon Parish and entering northwestern Rapides Parish.

In Rapides Parish, LA 8 continues northeastward, passing north of Lake Rodemacher, and merges with I-49 for approximately a mile. LA 8 then splits from I-49 after approximately a mile and passes through Boyce and heads due north, crossing the Red River into Grant Parish. At Colfax, LA 8 turns eastward and intersects U.S. Highway 71, US 167, and US 165 in Pollock. LA 8 then turns northeastward and enters La Salle Parish.

In Jena, LA 8 merges with US 84 and turns to the southeast. In Catahoula Parish, LA 8 passes through Harrisonburg and Sicily Island, where it ends at an intersection with US 425 and LA 15.

History
In the original Louisiana Highway system in use between 1921 and 1955, LA 8 was part of several shorter routes, including: State Route 21 from the Texas state line to Slagle; Route 107 to Boyce; Route 144 to Colfax; Route 19 to Harrisonburg; and Route 18 to Sicily Island.  All were designated by various acts of the state legislature between 1921 and 1926.  The routes were joined together under the single designation of LA 8 when the Louisiana Department of Highways renumbered the state highway system in 1955, creating one of several east–west cross-state routes.

Major junctions

Spur route

Louisiana Highway 8 Spur (LA 8 Spur) is a  highway in Flatwoods, Louisiana. It runs from west to east. LA 8 Spur follows the original routing from I-49 to LA 1, connecting the two highways. It is unsigned for its entire route. It was created in 2002, to give numbering to the short section between LA 1 and I-49.

References

0008
Transportation in Vernon Parish, Louisiana
Transportation in Rapides Parish, Louisiana
Transportation in Grant Parish, Louisiana
Transportation in LaSalle Parish, Louisiana
Transportation in Catahoula Parish, Louisiana